Charles Reid may refer to:
Charles Reid (Indian Army officer) (1819-1901), British army officer and GCB
Charles Reid (rugby union) (1864-1909), Scottish rugby player
Charles Reid (snowboarder) (born 1990), Canadian snowboarder
Charles C. Reid (1868–1922), U.S. Representative from Arkansas
Charles Carlow Reid (1879-1961), Scottish mining engineer and father of Sir William Reid
Chip Reid, American news reporter
Tony Reid (Charles Anthony Reid, born 1962), Barbados-born American former cricketer
Charles Reid (photographer) (1837–1929), Scottish photographer
Charles S. Reid (1898–1947), chief justice of the Supreme Court of Georgia
Charles Warwick Reid, involved in Attorney General for Hong Kong v Reid, Hong Kong legal case 1993
Charles Reid (painter) (1937-2019), American painter, illustrator, and teacher
Charles Reid Barnes (1858-1910), American botanist, and bryologist

See also
Charlie Reid (disambiguation)
Charles Reed (disambiguation)
Charles Read (disambiguation)
Charles Reade (disambiguation)